Ogbaku is a town made up of eighteen (18) villages in Mbaitoli Local Government Area of Imo state, South Eastern Nigeria. It is situated along Onitsha-Owerri road. It is about 12 km to the capital city of Owerri.

There is a cottage Hospital that hosts a wing of Imo State University Teaching Hospital and a postal agency. The town has pipeborne water and is connected to the national grid for electricity supply.

Towns in Imo State

OGBAKU, IMO. BASIC FACTS ABOUT THIS COMMUNITY